"Baltija" Shipbuilding Yard JSC (Baltijos laivų statykla) is a shipyard in Lithuania. The company—located in Klaipėda—supplies fleets and marine companies worldwide. However, many shipbuilding corporations such as STX Europe have shipbuilding or used to have shipbuilding operations in the Baltic States. "Baltija" builds pontoons, barges, trawlers, floating docks, river ferries, dry cargo ships and container carriers. "Baltija" also provides ship-repair services.

The Soviet Ministry of Shipbuilding founded the yard in 1952, in order to build fishing boats. In 1958, the yard started building steel floating docks. In 1992, the government of Lithuania held 96% of the shares, which were sold to Denmark-based Odense Steel Shipyard in April 1997. In 2010, the shipyard was acquired by the Estonian company BLRT Grupp.

The yard builds tugboats, grand blocks and outfitted superstructures, that are just part of container ships built in Germany and Denmark, and blocks for passenger liners built in Finland.

The company has grown steadily, in 1998, it produced 18,000 tons of steel for ship production, that grew to 32,000 tons in 2003, and was 55,400 tons in 2006. Employment peaked in 1999, at over 1800, and is now between 1500 and 1600.

References

External links
 Baltija website

Shipyards of Europe
Shipbuilding companies of Lithuania
Shipbuilding companies of the Soviet Union
Manufacturing companies established in 1952
1952 establishments in Lithuania
Companies based in Klaipėda
Lithuanian brands